Hyperthaema is a genus of moths in the family Erebidae. The genus was described by Schaus in 1901.

Species

References

External links

Phaegopterina
Moth genera